Dame Janet Marion Gaymer, DBE, KC (Hon.) (born 11 July 1947) served from January 2006 to December 2010 as a Civil Service Commissioner and Commissioner for Public Appointments, regulating ministerial appointments to designated public bodies in England, Wales and Northern Ireland.

Career
She was previously senior partner of Simmons & Simmons, an
international law firm, as well as Chair of the Employment Tribunal System Taskforce and a member of the Employment Tribunals Service Steering Board.

She has chaired the Law Society's Committee on Employment Law and the Employment Law Sub-Committee of the City of London Solicitors Company.
She was the founder chairman and is now life vice-president of the UK Employment Lawyers' Association. She is also the founder chairman and now honorary chairman of the European Employment Lawyers' Association. She was a member of the Council of the Advisory, Conciliation and Arbitration Service and chaired of its Audit Committee between 1995 and 2001.

Affiliations

She is an Honorary Fellow of St Hilda's College, Oxford, an Honorary Doctor of Laws of the University of Nottingham (where she is a "Special Professor"), an Honorary Doctor of the University of Surrey and a Governor of the London School of Economics. She became a Governor of the Royal Shakespeare Company in 1999.

Family
She is married with two children.

Honours
Already Commander of the Order of the British Empire (CBE), Gaymer was appointed Dame Commander of the Order of the British Empire (DBE) in the 2010 Birthday Honours.

References

External links
Civil Service Commission biography
 Gaymer's website
 Witt Group.org
 Biodata

1947 births
British civil servants
British solicitors
Dames Commander of the Order of the British Empire
21st-century King's Counsel
Living people
Place of birth missing (living people)
British women lawyers
Alumni of the London School of Economics
Governors of the London School of Economics
Commissioners for Public Appointments
Honorary King's Counsel